Yağmur Mislina Kılıç (born 30 May 1996) is a Turkish volleyball player for Kale 1957 Spor and the Turkish national team.

She participated at the 2015 FIVB Volleyball Women's U20 World Championship,  and 2018 FIVB Volleyball Women's Nations League.

References

External links 

 FIVB profile

1996 births
Living people
Eczacıbaşı volleyball players
Turkish women's volleyball players
Competitors at the 2018 Mediterranean Games
Mediterranean Games bronze medalists for Turkey
Mediterranean Games medalists in volleyball